Egypt has competed at every celebration of the Mediterranean Games since the 1951 Mediterranean Games. As of 2009, the Egyptian athletes have won a total of 455 medals .

Athletics

See also
 Egypt at the Olympics
 Egypt at the Paralympics
 Sports in Egypt

References

External links